Bo "Bosse" Johansson (born 28 November 1942) is a Swedish former football player and current football coach.

Career
Johansson was a player for fourteen years with Kalmar FF and Lindsdals IF, though he did not win any trophies as a player. In 1977, he was appointed coach for his former club of Kalmar FF, a job he held for two years before switching to local rivals Öster IF. He would remain there for three years, leading Östers IF to back-to-back Swedish Allsvenskan championships in 1980 and 1981. Johansson went on to coach Norwegian club FK Jerv, Greek club Panionios NFC, and started an international career coaching the Iceland national team. He would have to wait 13 years for his next title, until 1994 when he led Danish team Silkeborg IF to the national Danish Superliga championship.

In 1996, he was appointed Denmark national team coach, taking over from Richard Møller Nielsen who had managed the Danish team to the 1992 European Championship (Euro 1992) title, but had subsequently suffered lacklustre results. Bo Johansson presented a more offensive way of playing and he was successful in revitalising the Danish team, leading it to the 1998 FIFA World Cup in France, which was to become one of the heights in Danish football. Despite a loss in the group stage to later tournament winners France, Denmark managed to go through to the final 16 where they put an attractive style of football on display, beating Nigeria 4–1 before losing out 3–2 in the quarter-final to the later silver medalists from Brazil.

"Bosse" could not live up to the result and play at the 1998 World Cup two years later at the Euro 2000 in the Netherlands and Belgium. The Danish team lost all the games in the group stage and was eliminated. In 1999, Bo Johansson had made public that he wouldn't continue with the team after the tournament but he always remained popular. Following the Danish exit he was applauded off the pitch by the Danish fans. Totally, he coached the Danish national team throughout 40 matches, resulting in 17 victories, nine draws and 14 losses.

In 2003, he was appointed coach for the Swedish club IFK Göteborg, he retired in 2004. He made a comeback in 2005, leading Molde F.K. to victory in the Norwegian Cup. However, the club had a disappointing season in the league, and Johansson quit after the season. 2010, he returned to coaching as assisting coach in the Swedish club Åtvidaberg.

Honours
Östers IF
Allsvenskan: 1980, 1981

Silkeborg IF
Danish Superliga: 1994

Molde FK
Norwegian Cup: 2005

External links
Danish national team statistics
 Philosophy

1942 births
Living people
Swedish footballers
Swedish football managers
Expatriate football managers in Denmark
1998 FIFA World Cup managers
UEFA Euro 2000 managers
Kalmar FF managers
Östers IF managers
Panionios F.C. managers
Swedish expatriate football managers
Expatriate football managers in Iceland
Iceland national football team managers
Silkeborg IF managers
Helsingin Jalkapalloklubi managers
Denmark national football team managers
IFK Göteborg managers
Molde FK managers
Expatriate football managers in Greece
Expatriate football managers in Finland
Expatriate football managers in Norway
Swedish expatriate sportspeople in Norway
Association footballers not categorized by position
FK Jerv managers
People from Kalmar
Sportspeople from Kalmar County